Bromodomain-containing protein 8 is a protein that in humans is encoded by the BRD8 gene.

The protein encoded by this gene interacts with thyroid hormone receptor in a ligand-dependent manner and enhances thyroid hormone-dependent activation from thyroid response elements. This protein contains a bromodomain and is thought to be a nuclear receptor coactivator. Three alternatively spliced transcript variants that encode distinct isoforms have been identified.

Interactions 

BRD8 has been shown to interact with Thyroid hormone receptor beta and Retinoid X receptor alpha.

References

External links

Further reading